Proziaki, soda bread - flour-based rolls with added sodium bicarbonate (proza) originating from Subcarpathia in south-eastern Poland, also common in other parts of the country.

Proziaki are produced by the use of wheat flour or wheat-secale flour, eggs, sour smietana (sour cream), water, salt and a maximum of one tablespoon of sodium bicarbonate, baked on traditional tile surfaces, heated by firewood. Proziaki can be circular shaped (diameter of 6-10 cm, thickness ca. 1.5 cm) or quadrilateral. Presently, most proziaki are baked in an oven pan with a small amount of fat or lard (smalec). Sweet variants can be made with the addition of sugar.

In numerous Subcarpathian villages the proziaki pastries are diversified by adding buttermilk, cottage cheese or more butter. Traditionally, prozianki are served with fresh butter, cottage cheese or marmalade. Eating proziaki is frequently followed by drinking sweet milk.

References

Polish cuisine